Surviving Paradise: A Family Tale is a 2022 British nature documentary film made for Netflix. It is directed by Renée Godfrey and narrated by Regé-Jean Page. The film shows how bonds within different groups of animals are necessary for survival in Botswana's Kalahari Desert during a severe dry season. It was released on March 3, 2022.

References

External links 

 
 

2022 documentary films
Documentary films about nature
Films shot in South Africa
2022 films
Netflix original documentary films
2020s English-language films